Business Is Business (stylized as Bu$ine$$ I$ Bu$ine$$) is the second solo studio album by the American rapper PMD. It was released on October 22, 1996, through Relativity Records. The production was handled by Agallah, Charlie Marotta, DJ Scratch, Solid Scheme and Fabian Hamilton with PMD serving as executive producer. It features guest appearances from Das EFX, M.O.P. and Nocturnal.

The album debuted at number 180 on the Billboard 200 and number 29 on the Top R&B/Hip-Hop Albums.

Two singles were released from the album, "Rugged-n-Raw" featuring Das EFX, and "It's the Pee" featuring Mobb Deep. Both were minor hits on the R&B and Rap charts.

Track listing

Charts

References

External links

1996 albums
PMD (rapper) albums
Relativity Records albums
Albums produced by Agallah
Albums produced by DJ Scratch